River Muzizi is a river in Uganda, in East Africa. It separates the Two Banyakitara Kingdoms of (Amakama ga) Bunyoro-Kitara and Tooro

Location
The River Muzizi is located in the western part of Uganda. It starts from the hills, northwest of the town of Mubende in Mubende District, Central Uganda. It flows in a northwestern direction to empty into the bay of Muziizi in Lake Albert locally known as Mwitanzige, near the border between Uganda and the Democratic Republic of the Congo.

The source of River Muzizi is located in Mubende, with coordinates: Latitude:0.5772;  Longitude:31.1950. River Muzizi enters Lake Albert at Ndaiga, in Kagadi District, with coordinates: Latitude:1.0090; Longitude:30.5370. just few Kilometers east of Kanara town council in neighboring Ntoroko district. On its course northwestwards, the river traverses or forms the borders of the following districts : Mubende District, Kyegegwa District, Kibaale District, Kyenjojo District, Kabarole District, Kagadi District and Ntoroko District.

Muzizi Power Station

At this site, the Government of Uganda, plans to construct a 26 MW min-hydropower station, known as Muzizi Power Station. Construction is expected to begin in 2013, with commissioning expected in 2018.

External links
Rivers and Lakes of Uganda

See also
Lake Albert
Mubende
Ndaiga
Muzizi Power Station

References

 
Muzizi
Mubende District
Kyegegwa District
Kibaale District
Kyenjojo District
Kabarole District
Ntoroko District